Triphos refers to two distinct organophosphorus compounds:
1,1,1-Tris(diphenylphosphinomethyl)ethane
Bis(diphenylphosphinoethyl)phenylphosphine